Young Black Brotha may refer to:

Young Black Brotha (EP), a 1990 EP by Mac Dre
Young Black Brotha (album), a 1993 album by Mac Dre
Young Black Brotha Records, founded by Khayree